Boana paranaiba is a frog in the family Hylidae.  It is endemic to Brazil.

The scientists who first described this frog observed an average male snout-vent length of 46.3–52.3 mm and an average female snout-vent length of 46.2–51.2 mm.  The iris of the eye can be bronze in color or gray in color, with a whole or half blue ring.  The skin of the dorsum is reddish to yellow in color with irregular dark spots.  There are wide, brown stripes down its back and all four legs, outlined in white.  This frog has a thin white line on its mouth.  It has a dark brown line from its nose to each eye.  It has a dark brown line under its ear.  It has dark spots near its jaw. Its belly is yellow or whitish in color.  The insides of the back legs are dark brown with light spots.

Male frogs were found singing while seated on the ground or perched on vegetation up to 2 m high.  Scientists observed superficial scars on the backs of many male frogs and hypothesised they were caused by male-male interactions.

The frog is named after the Paranaíba River.  The name paranabia comes from the Tupi language.  It means "large river with muddy water".

References

paranaiba
Amphibians of Brazil
Endemic fauna of Brazil
Amphibians described in 2010